Ellen Jane Willis (December 14, 1941 – November 9, 2006) was an American left-wing political essayist, journalist, activist, feminist, and pop music critic. A 2014 collection of her essays, The Essential Ellen Willis, received the National Book Critics Circle Award for Criticism.

Early life and education 
Willis was born in Manhattan to a Jewish family, and grew up in the boroughs of the Bronx and Queens in New York City. Her father was a police lieutenant in the New York City Police Department. Willis attended Barnard College as an undergraduate and did graduate study at University of California, Berkeley, where she studied comparative literature.

Career 
In the late 1960s and 1970s, she was the first pop music critic for The New Yorker, and later wrote for, among others, the Village Voice, The Nation, Rolling Stone, Slate, and Salon, as well as Dissent, where she was also on the editorial board. She was the author of several books of collected essays.

At the time of her death, she was a professor in the journalism department of New York University and the head of its Center for Cultural Reporting and Criticism.

Writing and activism
Willis was known for her feminist politics. She was a member of New York Radical Women and subsequently co-founder in early 1969 with Shulamith Firestone of the radical feminist group Redstockings. She was one of the few women working in music criticism during its inaugural years when the field was predominantly male. Starting in 1979, Willis wrote a number of essays that were highly critical of anti-pornography feminism, criticizing it for what she saw as its sexual puritanism and moral authoritarianism, as well as its threat to free speech. These essays were among the earliest expressions of feminist opposition to the anti-pornography movement in what became known as the feminist sex wars. Her 1981 essay, Lust Horizons: Is the Women's Movement Pro-Sex? is the origin of the term, "pro-sex feminism".

She was a strong supporter of women's abortion rights, and in the mid-1970s was a founding member of the pro-choice street theater and protest group No More Nice Girls. A self-described anti-authoritarian democratic socialist, she was very critical of what she viewed as social conservatism and authoritarianism on both the political right and left. In cultural politics, she was equally opposed to the idea that cultural issues are politically unimportant, as well as to strong forms of identity politics and their manifestation as political correctness. 

In several essays and interviews written since the September 11 attacks, she cautiously supported humanitarian intervention and, while opposed to the 2003 invasion of Iraq, she criticized certain aspects of the anti-war movement.

Willis wrote a number of essays on anti-Semitism, and was particularly critical of left anti-Semitism. Occasionally she wrote about Judaism itself, penning a particularly notable essay about her brother's spiritual journey as a Baal Teshuva for Rolling Stone in 1977.

She saw political authoritarianism and sexual repression as closely linked, an idea first advanced by psychologist Wilhelm Reich; much of Willis' writing advances a Reichian or radical Freudian analysis of such phenomena. In 2006 she was working on a book on the importance of radical psychoanalytic thought to current social and political issues.

Rock criticism
Willis was the first popular music critic for The New Yorker, between 1968 and 1975. As such, she was one of the first American popular music critics to write for a national audience. She got the job after having published only one article on popular music, "Dylan" in the underground magazine Cheetah, in 1967. In addition to her "Rock, etc." column in the New Yorker, she also published criticism on popular music in Rolling Stone, the Village Voice, and for liner notes and book anthologies, most notably her essay on the Velvet Underground for the Greil Marcus "desert island disc" anthology Stranded (1979). Her contemporary Richard Goldstein characterized her work as "liberationist" at its heart and said that "Ellen, Emma Goldman, and Abbie Hoffman are part of a lost tradition — radicals of desire."

She was a friend of many contemporary critics, including Robert Christgau, Georgia Christgau, Greil Marcus, and Richard Goldstein. Christgau, Joe Levy, Evelyn McDonnell, Joan Morgan, and Ann Powers have all cited her as an influence on their careers and writing styles. At one point, she and Robert Christgau were lovers. In 2011, the first collection of Willis's music reviews and essays, Out of the Vinyl Deeps (University of Minnesota Press), arrived. It was edited by her daughter Nona Willis-Aronowitz. Ellen Willis "celebrated the seriousness of pleasure and relished the pleasure of thinking seriously," a review in The New York Times said.  It was announced that a conference at New York University, "Sex, Hope, & Rock 'n' Roll: The Writings of Ellen Willis", celebrated her anthology and pop music criticism on April 30, 2011.

Death
Willis died of lung cancer on November 9, 2006. Her papers were deposited in the Arthur and Elizabeth Schlesinger Library on the History of Women in America, in the Radcliffe Institute at Harvard University in 2008.

Personal life
Willis had met her second husband, sociology professor Stanley Aronowitz, in the late 1960s, and they entered a relationship some 10 years later. They shared domestic tasks equally.

She was survived by her husband and her daughter, Nona Willis-Aronowitz.

Legacy
Willis is featured in the feminist history film She's Beautiful When She's Angry.

Awards
 The Essential Ellen Willis, edited by Nona Willis Aronowitz, won the 2014 National Book Critics Circle Award (Criticism).

Bibliography

Books
 
 
 
 
 
 
 
  Willis wrote the foreword.

Essays, reporting and other contributions
 "Ellen Willis's Reply", 1968.
 "Women and the Myth of Consumerism", Ramparts, 1969.
 "Hell No, I Won't Go: End the War on Drugs", Village Voice, September 19, 1989.
 "Vote for Ralph Nader!", Salon, November 6, 2000.
 "The Realities of War" (A response to Elaine Scarry's “Citizenship in Emergency”), Boston Review, October/November 2002.
 "The Pernicious Concept of 'Balance'", The Chronicle of Higher Education, September 9, 2005.  Note: scroll down page.

References

External links

 Ellen Willis Tumblr Page - large collection of Willis's writings.
"Ellen Willis, 64, Journalist and Feminist, Dies" by Margalit Fox, The New York Times, November 10, 2006.
 "My Ellen Willis" by Michael Bronski, The Boston Phoenix, November 30, 2006.
 "Sex, Hope and Rock and Roll: A Conversation with Ellen Willis" by Chris O'Connell, Pop Matters, January 8, 2007.
Papers of Ellen Willis, 1941-2006. Schlesinger Library, Radcliffe Institute, Harvard University.

Reviews and critiques of Ellen Willis
  by Marcy Sheiner, San Francisco Bay Guardian, March 29, 2000.
 Bully in the Pulpit? (Discussion of Ellen Willis "Freedom From Religion"), The Nation, February 22, 2001.

Interviews
 "Ellen Willis, Feminist and Writer", Fresh Air, November 10, 2006 (originally broadcast February 14, 1989). (page links to RealAudio audio file)
 Interview with Ellen Willis and others on Implicating Empire by Doug Henwood, Left Business Observer (radio), March 27, 2003. (page links to MP3 audio)

1941 births
2006 deaths
20th-century essayists
American abortion-rights activists
American essayists
American feminist writers
American music critics
American women music critics
American music journalists
American political writers
American socialists
American women essayists
American women journalists
Barnard College alumni
Deaths from lung cancer in New York (state)
Feminist studies scholars
Jewish American journalists
Jewish feminists
Jewish socialists
New York Radical Women members
New York University faculty
Radical feminists
Redstockings members
Rolling Stone people
Sex-positive feminists
Socialist feminists
The Nation (U.S. magazine) people
The New Yorker people
The Village Voice people
Women writers about music
Writers from New York City